Jumpstyle is an electronic dance style and music genre popular in Western Europe, originally in Belgium.

Jumpstyling is often referred to as "Jumpen": a combination of the English word 'Jump' and the Dutch and German suffix '-en' (meaning "to jump", or "jumping").

It originated in Belgium but gathered bigger popularity in their neighbouring country the Netherlands in the 2000s.

History

Jumpstyle, originally known simply as jump, was created in Belgium. It was a short-lived small genre that did not gain popularity in its original form. However, it came back to the public during the turn of the century, and fandom began increasing throughout Europe after undergoing significant changes in Germany in early 2003.

After acquiring its current name, jumpstyle was reintroduced in Europe and in 2005 saw artists and groups producing and releasing its music.

The first key stage of its popularity came between 2007 and 2008 due to the success of music videos such as Scooter's "The Question Is What Is The Question?" and "Jumping All Over the World", which led to their 13th studio album reaching number 1 in the UK charts. However, there are still some radio stations left, broadcasting jump in its traditional form. The oldest jumpstyle radio was founded in 2005 and remained active until 2016 under the name of JumpStation.FM.

The style has also been fused with other genres, for example, Major Lazer and The Partysquad mixed a unique track with a jungle vocal sample in the track "Original Don", with jumpstyle/hardstyle influences. Also, Joel Fletcher's remix of Savage's 2005 single "Swing" uses jumpstyle influences.

Tournaments and leagues
There are various jumpstyle leagues across the world; mostly in the form of online video submissions and internet competitions. However, in Belgium there have been staged tournaments such as the European Jump Masters.

Music
Jumpstyle music is an offspring of tech-trance, hardstyle, gabber and mákina. Its tempo is usually between 140 and 150 BPM. However, it cannot be seen as merely a slowed down version of gabber. It is characterised by a 909 kick drum used in a four on the floor beat. It also has influences from hard house and electro house. Starting around 2002–03, jumpstyle began to gain influence from hardstyle sound, such as pitched basslines set at a melody, more complex, multiband distortion, and synthesizers utilising square waveforms.

References

Dance culture
Dance in the Netherlands
Belgian styles of music
Electronic dance music genres
Rave